Bersame Glacier is the 2.4 km long and 1.5 km wide glacier on the west side of Urda Ridge on Clarence Island in the South Shetland Islands, Antarctica situated northeast of Giridava Glacier.  It drains the slopes of Mount Llana, flows northwestwards and enters the Southern Ocean northeast of the terminus of Giridava Glacier.

The glacier is named after the Thracian settlement of Bersame in Southeastern Bulgaria.

Location
British mapping in 1972 and 2009.

See also
 List of glaciers in the Antarctic
 Glaciology

Maps
British Antarctic Territory. Scale 1:200000 topographic map. DOS 610 Series, Sheet W 61 54. Directorate of Overseas Surveys, Tolworth, UK, 1972.
South Shetland Islands: Elephant, Clarence and Gibbs Islands. Scale 1:220000 topographic map. UK Antarctic Place-names Committee, 2009.
 Antarctic Digital Database (ADD). Scale 1:250000 topographic map of Antarctica. Scientific Committee on Antarctic Research (SCAR). Since 1993, regularly upgraded and updated.

References
 Bulgarian Antarctic Gazetteer. Antarctic Place-names Commission. (details in Bulgarian, basic data in English)
Bersame Glacier. SCAR Composite Gazetteer of Antarctica.

External links
 Bersame Glacier. Copernix satellite image

Glaciers of Clarence Island (South Shetland Islands)
Bulgaria and the Antarctic